Priska Madelyn Nugroho (born 29 May 2003) is an Indonesian tennis player. She reached her career-high WTA rankings of No. 275 in singles and 197 in doubles. She is currently the highest-ranked Indonesian tennis player in singles on either WTA and ATP Tours. She has won five titles in singles and eleven in doubles on the ITF Women's Circuit.

At the age of 14, she won the WTA Future Stars event in the U-14 category at the 2017 WTA Finals in Singapore. In 2019, Priska was selected to represent Indonesia at the Southeast Asian Games and won the bronze medal in singles. In 2020, partnering Alexandra Eala, she won the 2020 Australian Open girls' doubles title.

Junior Grand Slam performance
Singles:
 Australian Open: 3R (2020)
 French Open: 2R (2019)
 Wimbledon: QF (2019)
 US Open: QF (2019)

Doubles:
 Australian Open: W (2020)
 French Open: 1R (2021)
 Wimbledon: 2R (2021)
 US Open: –

Career 
Priska debuted as a professional in 2018, aged 15, at an ITF Circuit tournament in Solo, where she lost in the first round of singles and quarterfinal of doubles. In 2021, she reached her first pro circuit final in doubles alongside Federica Rossi at a $15k event in Amarante, Portugal in July before winning her first pro title with Naho Sato at another $15k event in Frederiksberg, Denmark the following month. Priska reached her first singles final at a $15k event in Cairo, Egypt in November, losing to Carson Branstine.

In 2021, Priska began playing college tennis for the North Carolina State University in the Atlantic Coast Conference. In 2022, she completed her freshman year with a 23–8 win-loss record in singles ranked No. 89 nationally and a 26–4 win-loss record in doubles. She was named Freshman of the Year by the Atlantic Coast Conference in June 2022.

In October 2022, Priska played her first WTA Tour qualifying match in the first series of Jasmin Open, losing against Ana Konjuh 4–6, 2–6. She then qualified for her first $60k singles tournament also in Monastir, losing to Sara Errani in the quarterfinal 2–6, 4–6 after beating higher-ranked Suzan Lamens 6–4, 6–3 in the previous round. She followed this up by competing in two $60k tournaments in Australia, losing 6–7, 1–6 to Jaimee Fourlis in the second round of the Playford International and 2–6, 3–6 to Alexandra Bozovic in the first round of NSW Open in Sydney. These results brought Priska to a new career-high singles ranking of No. 512 on 7 November 2022, taking over as the top-ranked Indonesian player on tour in singles from Aldila Sutjiadi who had dropped to No. 525 on the same week.

Overall, between June and December 2022, Priska won three $15k singles titles, four $15k doubles titles, two $25k singles titles, three $25k doubles titles, and her first $60k doubles title in Monastir, Tunisia. These results brought her to new career-high rankings of No. 276 in singles (achieved on 6 February 2023) and No. 197 in doubles (achieved on 30 January 2023).

ITF Circuit finals

Singles: 8 (5 titles, 3 runner–ups)

Doubles: 16 (11 titles, 5 runner–ups)

Junior Grand Slam finals

Doubles: 1 (title)

ITF Junior Circuit finals

Singles: 12 (7 titles, 5 runner–ups)

Doubles: 8 (5 titles, 3 runner–ups)

Other finals

Singles: 1 (title)

National representation

Multi-sport event
Priska made her debut representing Indonesia in multi-sport event at the 2019 Southeast Asian Games, she won the women's singles bronze medal.

Singles: 1 (bronze medal)

Billie Jean King Cup
Priska made her Billie Jean King Cup debut at age 17 against Chinese Taipei at the 2020-2021 Asia/Oceania Group I qualifying in Dubai, United Arab Emirates.

Singles (3–1)

Doubles (1–3)

References

External links
 
 
 

2003 births
Living people
Indonesian female tennis players
Grand Slam (tennis) champions in girls' doubles
Australian Open (tennis) junior champions
Competitors at the 2019 Southeast Asian Games
Southeast Asian Games bronze medalists for Indonesia
Southeast Asian Games medalists in tennis
NC State Wolfpack women's tennis players
21st-century Indonesian women